Luo Heng may refer to:

Luo Heng (politician) (羅衡), Chinese politician
Luo Heng (footballer) (罗恒), Chinese footballer
Luo Yin (罗橫), Chinese poet born Luo Heng